Christopher John Baran is an American singer, songwriter, producer, and actor. He is a founding member of Woolf and the Wondershow and cowriter, creator, and producer of their Los Angeles future theater musical CAGES in which he plays the lead character Woolf. He has produced and written songs for Panic! At The Disco, Melanie Martinez, Carly Rae Jepsen, Mika, Britney Spears, COIN, Andrew McMahon, One OK Rock, Bea Miller, Pentatonix, Simple Plan, Pixie Lott, and Nelly. He was a founding member of the band Push Play.

Early life
Baran is originally from Melville, New York, where he attended St. Anthony's High School. He took an early interest in music, learning several instruments and beginning his first band at 11, Kaution.

Career

Push Play
In September 2006, Baran joined Steve Scarola, Nick DeTurris and Derek Ries to form Push Play. Baran was lead vocalist, keyboard player, and rhythm guitarist for the Long Island-based band.

Their debut album, Deserted, was released in December 2007. The album rose into the top 100 album sales on iTunes, peaking at No. 38. The band signed with Creative Artists Agency's Jason Morey, the agent for Miley Cyrus. The band opened for Cyrus at the MGM Grand-Foxwoods to start their 2008 tour, putting a portion of the proceeds for some of their 2008 shows to charities "Friends of the Arts" and the "Education and Assistance Corporation."

Push Play received a record deal from Wind-Up Records in 2008. Their album, Found, was produced by Matt Squire. "Midnight Romeo", their single from the album, hit No. 37 on the mainstream Top 40 radio chart.

After their 2009 tour promoting Found, the band took time off. Baran acknowledges that the final tour hit a "terrible rough patch" outside the Northeast, and he later claimed that he did not enjoy touring. Baran moved to Los Angeles—where he still resides—and pursued production by interning with Matt Squire, and writing his own music. In February 2010, Baran announced the dissolution of the band on the Push Play MySpace page.

Production
Baran went on to sign with Pulse Recording for his writing and production work in 2011. In 2013, Baran met producer Max Martin, who brought Baran on to his recording company, MXM. Baran is co-signed with both Pulse and MXM.

Baran has worked with a number of artists, including Panic! at the Disco, Melanie Martinez, Carly Rae Jepsen, Mika, Britney Spears, COIN, Andrew McMahon, One OK Rock, Bea Miller, Pentatonix, Simple Plan and Nelly. His songs have also appeared on the TV series Empire, with his song "Do it" featuring Becky G. Baran has worked as a writer and producer with Pixie Lott over multiple albums going back to 2011, including providing vocals on the song "Till the Sun Comes Up."

Baran's work has received a number of awards. He wrote and produced Panic! at the Disco's "Victorious," which climbed to number one on Apple Music and No. 89 on the Billboard Hot 100 in fall 2015. The song is part of the Grammy-nominated album, Death of a Bachelor, which became the number one album on the Billboard 200 in January 2016. Baran co-wrote and co-produced the songs "Emotion" and "Let's Get Lost" on Carly Rae Jepsen's E-MO-TION album, which Billboard.com rated one of the top 25 albums of the year. Baran also co-wrote and produced Melanie Martinez's "Pity Party," which became a Gold single from the RIAA in 2016.

Baran's current project is Woolf and the Wondershow, with composer Benjamin Romans, which began releasing music in 2015. The duo's work is a music, film, and performance piece that tells a story of love in a fantastical New York City setting over multiple songs. Their debut EP, We Need to Talk, was released in June 2016.

CAGES
In 2019, Baran and partner Benjamin Romans, continuing as Woolf and the Wondershow, began performing their future theater show CAGES in a converted warehouse in The Arts District of Downtown Los Angeles. Baran and Romans co-wrote the music and lyrics. During the show, Baran performs live on stage as main character Woolf, while Romans performs the live score. The warehouse has been outfitted with a top-of-the-line sound system, 1920s theater seats, and a custom-made scent diffuser. CAGES has been noted as an innovative experience that blends Broadway, pop music and film. As described by Forbes, CAGES “is one part Les Mis, another part Kanye West, a dash of Broadway here, and a sprinkle of cinema there - all mixed together in an entirely new kind of immersive blender complete with earth-shattering sound.”

Discography

References

External links

Living people
American male singer-songwriters
People from Huntington, New York
Singer-songwriters from New York (state)
1990 births